Afipia birgiae is a species in the Afipia bacterial genus. It is a gram-negative, oxidase-positive rod in the alpha-2 subgroup of the class Proteobacteria. It is motile by means of a single flagellum. Its type strain is 34632T (=CIP 106344T =CCUG 43108T).

Afipia birgiae is a fastidious bacteria isolated from a hospital water supply in co-culture with amoebae. It is hypothesized that this group of bacteria are a potential cause of nosocomial infections.

References

Further reading

External links
LPSN

Type strain of Afipia birgiae at BacDive -  the Bacterial Diversity Metadatabase

Nitrobacteraceae
Bacteria described in 2002